Miguel Alfredo González Puebla (September 23, 1983 – November 23, 2017) was a Cuban professional baseball pitcher. He played in the Cuban National Series, for the Cuban national baseball team, and in 2014 for the Philadelphia Phillies of Major League Baseball (MLB).

Professional career

Cuban baseball career
González pitched for La Habana in the Cuban National Series from 2007 through 2009. He played for the Cuba national baseball team in the 2009 World Port Tournament and 2009 and 2011 Baseball World Cups. He was playing for the Artemisa team when he was caught trying to defect in January 2012 and he was suspended from playing in the league at that point. He succeeded in defecting from Cuba to El Salvador in 2013, and then moved to Mexico.

American baseball career
González pitched in some games for the Toros de Tijuana of the Liga Norte de México as a showcase for American scouts, including those from the Los Angeles Dodgers, Boston Red Sox and Chicago Cubs. On July 26, 2013, stories in the press reported that González agreed to a six-year contract with the Philadelphia Phillies, worth $60 million. However, the Phillies never confirmed the report and subsequent reports mentioned that the deal might not happen. On August 30, 2013, the Phillies announced they had signed González to a three-year, $12 million contract with a vesting option for 2017.

Entering spring training, it was still unknown whether he would be a member of the big league starting rotation, bullpen, or whether he would start the season with the Phillies Class AAA affiliate, the Lehigh Valley IronPigs. Ultimately, he opened the season on the 60-day disabled list (DL) "after not exactly impressing in a poor spring";  the official reason for his placement on the DL was "right shoulder tendinitis".  Upon returning from injury, Gonzalez ascended through the Phillies' minor league system on a rehab assignment, compiling 54 strikeouts in  innings pitched.  Used primarily out of the bullpen in his rehab stint, Gonzalez completed his minor league assignment with a 3.11 earned run average (ERA) and .231 opponent batting average. Deemed healthy and ready to begin his MLB career, Gonzalez was activated and assigned to the Phillies on September 2 as part of the roster expansion call-ups. He recorded a 6.75 ERA in  innings pitched in the major leagues.

A poor spring training in 2015 led to the Phillies outrighting González to the minor leagues and removing him from the 40-man roster. He was released by the Phillies on April 1, 2016.

Death
González was killed in a traffic accident in Havana, Cuba, on November 23, 2017.

See also
List of baseball players who defected from Cuba
List of baseball players who died during their careers

References

External links

1983 births
2017 deaths
Baseball players from Havana
Defecting Cuban baseball players
Major League Baseball pitchers
Vaqueros de la Habana players
Cazadores de Artemisa players
Philadelphia Phillies players
Clearwater Threshers players
Reading Fightin Phils players
Lehigh Valley IronPigs players
Pan American Games medalists in baseball
Pan American Games bronze medalists for Cuba
Florida Complex League Phillies players
Águilas del Zulia players
Cuban expatriate baseball players in Venezuela
Road incident deaths in Cuba
Baseball players at the 2011 Pan American Games
Medalists at the 2011 Pan American Games